The Arnold River is a river in the north of the Northern Territory of Australia.

Course and features
The river is joined by two tributaries including the Williams and Horse creeks and flows through a series of lagoons and waterholes before reaching its river mouth.

Etymology
The river is named for Richard Aldous Arnold, a pastoralist and politician, who purchased a pastoral lease in the area in 1895. The lease was a part of the Hodgson Downs cattle station. He sold his interest in 1905 and continued his political career as Clerk of the Legislative Assembly of New South Wales.

See also

List of rivers of Northern Territory

References

Rivers of the Northern Territory